The 2003 Arkansas vs. Kentucky football game was a college football game played on November 1, 2003 between the University of Arkansas Razorbacks and the University of Kentucky Wildcats; at the time, it tied an NCAA record for the  longest football game ever played. The game included seven overtime periods. Penn State and the Illinois beat that record in October 2021, albeit under different overtime rules. Arkansas led the game all but a few minutes of regulation until a Kentucky touchdown drive in the last few minutes tied it at 24–24. Both teams had a blocked punt recovered for a touchdown, another rarity. The game ended in the seventh overtime period when Kentucky quarterback Jared Lorenzen fumbled the football on a quarterback keeper play, ending the game.

Before the game
Coincidentally, Arkansas played a 7 overtime game against Ole Miss on November 3, 2001 - winning that game 58–56. Arkansas also lost a 6 overtime game to Tennessee in 2002, 38–41. Former Arkansas head coach Houston Nutt has been recorded as saying about overtime, "Winning is always fun, but when you win in overtime, where your players had to go that extra mile, it's really gratifying and special." Nutt continued to say, "I always like our chances in overtime."

Kentucky's head man Rich Brooks has said of overtime, "[Nutt has] obviously been through a lot of them, and when you get through them and know you've had success and your team knows you've had success, I think mentally that goes a long ways in helping you get the victory ultimately whether it goes one, two, three, four or seven overtimes."

Kentucky was 1–1 in overtime coming into this contest, beating Alabama and losing to Louisville both by the score of 40–34, both being only one overtime affairs.

Game summary

First quarter
The game began at 7:00 pm eastern time on November 1, 2003, but would continue into November 2. The game opened with three punts before Decori Birmingham ran for a ten-yard score for Arkansas to give the Hogs a 7-0 lead. Another three punts before Arkansas' had their punt blocked, to be recovered by Kentucky's Andrew Hopewell for a touchdown to tie the game 7-7.

Second quarter
Arkansas quarterback Matt Jones threw a 26-yard touchdown strike to Richard Smith to open the scoring in the second period. It wasn't long before Arkansas' special teams returned the favor to Kentucky, blocking a Wildcat punt and scoring to push the Razorback advantage to 21-7. A promising drive was ended when an errant pass by Jared Lorenzen was intercepted by Ahmad Carroll, but the Razorbacks failed to capitalize, missing the 40-yard field goal before heading into the locker room for halftime.

Third quarter
The Wildcats came out and scored on the first second half possession, a 51-yard touchdown toss by Lorenzen to fullback Alexis Bwenge, cutting into the Razorbacks cushion. Cedric Cobbs of Arkansas fumbled at the end of the third quarter, but after recovering Kentucky was forced to punt, down 21-14.

Fourth quarter
Both teams swapped field goals before Lorenzen hit Chris Bernard to tie the game at 24. Arkansas had a chance at a game-winning drive with the ball with 1:30 left and two timeouts, but the drive ended in a punt with fourteen ticks left on the clock.

Overtime
In college football, both teams start on the opponent's twenty-five yard line and try to score (similar to innings in baseball). These overtimes repeat until a winner is decided. This system was adopted in 1996.

First overtime
Birmingham started off the extra frame with three straight rushes and a first down. Matt Jones added an 11-yard completion before fullback Mark Pierce scored from one yard out. Kentucky's drive was helped out by Arkansas, with ten and seven yard penalties bringing the Wildcats seventeen of the twenty five yards required to score a touchdown. A two-yard touchdown run from Alexis Bwenge, with complete extra point from placekicker Taylor Begley knotted the game at 31.

Second overtime
Kentucky began on the offensive end in the second overtime, and scored on their second play. First, an 18-yard hookup from Lorenzen to Jeremiah Drobney before Alexis Bwenge again scored the go-ahead touchdown to give the Wildcats a 38-31 lead. Arkansas ran the ball five times before calling a timeout with a third down on the Kentucky two-yard line. Arkansas came out of the time out and committed a penalty costing the Razorbacks five precious yards, but Matt Jones completed his pass across the middle to Jason Peters to force a third overtime.

Third overtime
As per NCAA rules, beginning with the third overtime teams must go for a two-point conversion instead of kicking an extra point, but both Arkansas and Kentucky could only manage field goals on their possessions.

Matt Jones began with a 13-yard completion, but the Arkansas drive stalled and Chris Balseiro had to kick a 25-yard field goal. Similar to Arkansas' first overtime drive, Kentucky ran the ball five times before calling a timeout on a third down on the Arkansas two-yard line. The Razorback defense kept Ronald (Rock) Johnson out of the end zone, forcing a Taylor Begley field goal and tying the game at 41.

Fourth overtime
Lorenzen completed two passes on the drive, and finally ran in for the score in the fourth overtime. The two point play was a Jared Lorenzen completion to Derek Abney. Arkansas moved to the Kentucky two before Matt Jones fumbled. Jones recovered his own miscue. After a timeout, an incomplete Jones pass meant Arkansas must either score on the fourth down play or drop a fourth straight game. Jones scrambled into the end zone, and then completed a pass to Mark Pierce to draw to a 49-49 tie heading into the fifth overtime.

Fifth overtime
After an 11-yard Birmingham run, Jones slung a 15-yard touchdown pass to take the lead into the fifth overtime, but the two point pass to Wilson was incomplete,  meaning Kentucky had only to score and make the two-point conversion to end the game. A two-yard run by Derek Abney, followed with a Jared Lorenzen pass across the middle complete to Jeremiah Drobney for 7 yards put the Wildcats in business. "Hefty Lefty" Jared Lorenzen then ran the ball four plays, culminating in fourteen yards total and a touchdown. Tied at 55, Kentucky attempted the two point play that could have finished the game. The pass to Tommy Cook was incomplete, however, sending the game into a sixth overtime.

Sixth overtime
Lorenzen continued his success on the ground with eighteen yards in the sixth overtime, one of his runs a one-yard touchdown run. This time, the pass to Tommy Cook was good, giving the Wildcats a 63-55 advantage.
Matt Jones quickly answered with a sixteen-yard pass and seven-yard rush, moving the Hog offense to the two. Mark Pierce rumbled the additional two yards to score, and Arkansas was a two-point play away from a seventh overtime. Jones completed the pass to Wilson to knot the game at 63.

Seventh overtime
Matt Jones threw an incomplete pass before Decori Birmingham scored on a 25-yard touchdown run to give the Hogs a 69-63 advantage. The all-important two-point conversion was a completion to Jason Peters, giving Arkansas a 71-63 cushion. Kentucky first completed a pass for twelve yards, but a fourth and three on the Razorback five proved the game winner, as a Lorenzen fumble was recovered by all-SEC linebacker Tony Bua of Arkansas.

Statistics

Aftermath
The game ended at 12:01 am on November 2, 2003. This game also set an NCAA record for the most points scored in a game (after 1950, until 2018). Arkansas scored 47 points in overtime, breaking their own record of 41. Both teams combined for 86 overtime points, six more than the 2001 seven overtime affair. The game lasted 4 hours and 56 minutes.

Players involved
Matt Jones went 16 of 25 passing for 260 yards and three TDs, while running for 112 yards and a score. Decori Birmingham, normally a receiver but filling in for injured tailbacks, had 196 yards rushing and two touchdowns for Arkansas.  Arkansas wideout George Wilson caught nine passes for 172 yards and a score.

For Kentucky, Lorenzen went 28 of 49, throwing for 326 yards, two touchdowns and one interception. Lorenzen also added 39 rushing yards and three rushing TD's to his total. Abney was Lorenzen's favorite target, catching ten balls for 91 yards.

See also
 2007 Navy vs. North Texas football game – formerly the FBS record for most points scored in a game in regulation.
 2007 Weber State vs. Portland State football game – featured the most points scored in a game between two Division I opponents.

References

 "Arkansas posts another 'unbelievable' seven-overtime win." November 2, 2003. Story at ESPN.com. Retrieved on March 8, 2008.
 

2003 Southeastern Conference football season
vs. Kentucky 2003
vs. Arkansas 2003
November 2003 sports events in the United States
2003 in sports in Kentucky